The following are lists of justices of several national Supreme Courts:

  : List of Justices of the High Court of Australia
  : List of justices of the Supreme Court of Canada
  : List of justices of the Federal Constitutional Court
  : List of justices of the Supreme Court of Ghana
  : List of justices of the Supreme Court of Iceland
  : List of sitting judges of the Supreme Court of India
  : List of judges of the Supreme Court of Ireland
  : List of justices of the Supreme Court of Japan
  : List of sitting judges of the Supreme Court of Nepal
  : List of justices of the Supreme Court of Pakistan
  List of justices of the Supreme Court of the Philippines
  : List of justices of the Constitutional Court of Korea
  : List of justices of the Supreme Court of Sri Lanka
  : List of judges of the Federal Supreme Court of Switzerland
  : List of judges of the Supreme Court of the United Kingdom
  : List of justices of the Supreme Court of the United States

See also 
 Supreme court
 List of national supreme courts